Banī Shaʿb is a sub-district located in the Shar'ab as-Salam District, Taiz Governorate, Yemen. Banī Shaʿb had a population of 3,489 according to the 2004 census.

References

Sub-districts in Shar'ab as-Salam District